Julen Castañeda Nuin (born 14 November 1990) is a Spanish footballer who plays for Cultural y Deportiva Leonesa as a left-back.

Club career
Born in San Sebastián, Gipuzkoa, Castañeda played youth football with local Real Sociedad. He made his senior debut in the 2010–11 season with the B team, in the Segunda División B.

On 14 July 2013, Castañeda signed a two-year deal with Segunda División club SD Ponferradina. He played his first professional game on 17 August, starting in a 1–0 away loss against Córdoba CF.

Castañeda scored his first goal in the competition on 9 November 2014, his side's second in the 3–3 home draw with Recreativo de Huelva. He was released in 2015, and subsequently resumed his career in the third division by representing Burgos CF, Racing de Santander and Cultural y Deportiva Leonesa.

References

External links

1990 births
Living people
Spanish footballers
Footballers from San Sebastián
Association football defenders
Segunda División players
Segunda División B players
Primera Federación players
Real Sociedad B footballers
SD Ponferradina players
Burgos CF footballers
Racing de Santander players
Cultural Leonesa footballers